Wendell P. Weeks (born 1959/60) is an American businessman, the chairman, CEO, and president of Corning Inc.

Education
Weeks received a bachelor's degree in accounting and finance from Lehigh University in Bethlehem, Pennsylvania, in 1981, and an MBA from Harvard Business School in 1987.

Business career

Corning
Weeks joined Corning in 1983. He held a variety of financial, business development, commercial, and general management roles, including strategic positions in the company’s television, specialty glass, and optical communications businesses.

In 1996, Weeks was named vice president and general manager of Corning’s optical fiber business, a tenure which included managing through a major sales downturn.

Weeks has been a director of Corning since December 2000.

He was promoted to chief executive officer in April 2005. A notable action was rapid movement into production of Gorilla Glass, for the new iPhone.

He became chairman in April 2007.

Non-executive roles
Weeks has been a member of the board of directors of Amazon.com since February 2016.

Business philosophy
Weeks has said that "If you’re going to sustain as an institution, you have to focus on problems that matter. For Corning, some of those things are cleaner air; safer, more effective medicines; and fast, reliable communication. A company’s value is ultimately measured by whether or not it does good in society." He believes that creative destruction is an important part of capitalism, but so is collaboration. He regards failures as opportunities to learn.

Personal life
Weeks met his wife, Kim Frock, at Harvard Business School. She worked at Corning and helped initiate and volunteered with a local school project. They have two children.

Weeks believes that you will be happy if you “find the people you love working with and something you are really excited to work on" (even if it doesn’t lead to external recognition).

References

Living people
American business executives
Harvard Business School alumni
Lehigh University alumni
Amazon (company) people
Year of birth uncertain
Year of birth missing (living people)